Charles T. Wardlaw (1858–1928) was a politician in Dawes County, Nebraska, and a financier and civic leader in Los Angeles, California.

Wardlaw was born on June 30, 1858, in Granville, Illinois, to A.F. and Nancy J. Wardlaw.

In 1900, Wardlaw was county clerk in Dawes County, Nebraska, where he was also chairman of the county Democratic Committee. He was also affiliated with a newspaper there called The Chadronian.

Wardlaw was in the railroad service, being at different times an agent, a dispatcher and freight and passenger agent. He was a manager of the "great California-Mexico Ranch" and then moved to the San Fernando Valley in 1919, where he became a banker and a financier. Along with Harry Chandler and M.H. Sherman, he was a subdivider of the first building tract in Van Nuys, California.

He died of a heart attack in his home on Van Nuys Boulevard on February 24, 1928, being survived by his wife, Pamella R. Wardlaw, a son, John R. or John J. Wardlaw, and a daughter, Mrs. Eva W. Day.

References

Further reading

 An article in the Crawford Tribune attacking Wardlaw for appointing his wife as a deputy in the clerk's office. 

People from Van Nuys, Los Angeles
American financiers
People from Granville, Illinois
American people in rail transportation
1858 births
1928 deaths